Miha Bregar (born 25 October 1993) is a Slovenian male volleyball player. He is part of the Slovenia men's national volleyball team and plays the position of Middle Blocker. He competed at the 2011 CEV Youth Volleyball European Championship and 2012 CEV Junior Volleyball European Championship. At club level he plays for Mok Krka.

See also 
 Slovenia men's national volleyball team

References

External links 
 FIVB 2016 Stats
 Player Details
 Slovenia Men's Team Start Preparations for World League
 WorldOfVolley
 Victory remained in Tivoli 

1993 births
Living people
Slovenian men's volleyball players